Nairn railway station is a railway station serving the town of Nairn in Scotland. The station is managed and served by ScotRail and is on the Aberdeen to Inverness Line, between Forres and Inverness Airport, measured  from Perth via the former Dava route. It is a category B listed building.

History
The station was first opened in 1855 by the Inverness and Nairn Railway. In 1857, the line was extended eastwards to Dalvey. The route from Aberdeen to Inverness was merged into one company, the Inverness and Aberdeen Junction Railway, in 1861.  

In 1885 the Highland Railway Company agreed to improve the facilities at Nairn. The station buildings were replaced with improved accommodation for passenger and staff. It was constructed of dressed freestone and consisted of ticket and parcels offices, waiting hall, verandah, ladies’ and gentlemen’s waiting rooms, left luggage and porters’ room. The gables of the cross wings were surmounted with the Scotch thistle, the Prince of Wales feather, and other designs sculpted in stone. The masonry work was completed by Mr. Squair of Nairn. The work was completed in 1886. 

At the same time a new station master’s house was erected. A new iron foot bridge over the line connected the platforms, avoiding passengers using a foot crossing over the running lines. The bridge over Cawdor Road was also widened at the same time. 

Many of the local stations either side of here succumbed to the Beeching Axe between 1965 and 1968, though Nairn was one of those that survived the cutbacks.

The station was notable for being the last working example of Highland Railway signalling principles, where a signal box was provided at each end to work the signals & points whilst the key token instruments for working the single line were located in the main building.  The distance between the boxes was such that a bicycle was officially provided by BR (and later Railtrack) for the signaller to use.  The practice came to an end in April 2000, when the station was resignalled with colour lights and control shifted to a panel in the station building - as a result, most passenger services use the northern (former eastbound) platform in both directions (the southern one is now only used by Aberdeen-bound services if two trains are scheduled to pass here).

Control of the signalling at the station has since transferred to a new workstation in the Inverness signalling centre, following a 10-day line closure that also saw the loop at Elgin lengthened and a new station and loop commissioned at Forres.  A replacement bus service ran whilst the work was in progress, with the line reopening on schedule on 17 October 2017.

Facilities 
The station has a ticket office, ticket machine and accessible toilet on platform 1, adjacent to some bike racks and one of the car parks. The other is adjacent to platform 2, which is equipped with a flower shop and a help point. There is step-free access to both platforms, but not between them, as the bridge linking them does not have lifts.

Passenger Volume 

The statistics cover twelve month periods that start in April.

Services
As of May 2022, there are seventeen daily departures from the station each way on weekdays and Saturdays. Most are through trains between Aberdeen and Inverness, but some trains start from or terminate at Elgin. One departure runs through to Edinburgh in the morning, and one in the evening runs to Stonehaven. On Sundays there are five through trains each way to Inverness and Aberdeen, with two more from Glasgow to Elgin via Inverness that call eastbound.

Cultural References 
The station appeared as 'Inverness' in the 1970 film The Private Life of Sherlock Holmes.

References

Further reading

External links

Railscot - Nairn

Railway stations in Highland (council area)
Former Highland Railway stations
Railway stations in Great Britain opened in 1855
Railway stations served by ScotRail
Listed railway stations in Scotland
Category B listed buildings in Highland (council area)
Nairn